Sir Humphrey Style (died 1557) of Langley Park, Beckenham, Kent, was an Esquire of the Body of Henry VIII of England and a sheriff of Kent.

Biography
Style was the son of John Stile (died 1505), alderman of London, and Elizabeth, daughter and coheir of Sir Guy Wolston of London.

Style was one of the Esquires of the Body to Henry VIII, and Sheriff of Kent in 1543. 

Style procured a grant from Sir Thomas Wriothesley, Garter principal king at arms, reciting, that not being willing to bear arms in prejudice to the other branches of his family, he had petitioned for a coat, with a proper difference, which the said king at arms, in 1529, granted, under his hand and seal: Sable, a fess engrailed between threefears de Us, within a bordure or, the fess fretted of the field. He also procured, with others, an act of parliament in 1549 (the 3rd years of reign Edward VI) for the disgavelling of his lands in the county of Kent. He died in 1557, and was buried in Beckenham church.

Family
With his first wife, Bridget, daughter of Sir Thomas Baldrey, Style had three sons:
 Edmund (born 1538), was born at Langley. His son William Style was the father of Sir Humphrey Style, 1st Baronet and his half brother William Style a barrister and noted court reporter.
  Oliver, who was Sheriff of London, and ancestor of the Styles, of the baronetcy of Watringbury.
 Nicholas, who was knighted.
His memorial in St. George's church Beckenham illustrates 9 children by his first wife Bridget Baldry (6 sons and 3 daughters) and 2 by his second wife Elizabeth Peryn, daughter of George Peryn Esquire (one son and one daughter). Records from Beckenham burial transcripts indicate that some children died in infancy or before reaching majority. His marriages and several children are recorded in the Style genealogy in the Visitation of London 1568.
Seven baptisms of Stile's children are recorded in Lyson's Environs of London, Maria and Humphrey by Elizabeth Peryn which would indicate that an earlier child named Humphrey by Bridget Baldry probably died before 1539 when parish records began. St. George's burial records and some children predeceased Sir Humphrey while others were minors after his death and would have been wards or step-children of Elizabeth's Peryn's second husband, Thomas Townesend. Lyson's records also list John, Oliver, Nicholas and Bridget born to Bridget Baldry before her death in 1548.
The Philadelphia Museum of Art has panelling said to come from Red Lodge at Langley dated to 1529, attributed to John Stile but more likely related to Humphrey Stile's acquisition of a coat of arms and knighthood.

Notes

thumb

References

Visitation of London 1568 

Esquires of the Body

1557 deaths

Year of birth unknown